Dagon Khin Khin Lay (20 February 1904 – 23 June 1981) was a Burmese novelist, screenwriter, and cinematographer. Founder of Dagon Publishing Company, Khin Khin Lay, along with Journal Kyaw Ma Ma Lay and Ludu Daw Amar, she was one of the few female publishers in Burma.

Biography
Khin Khin Lay was born Khin Lay Latt in Mandalay to Khin Khin Latt and Myat Kyaw, a police officer. Khin Khin Lay was only 12 when she won a literary award competition with her first novel Nwe Nwe in 1917. At 18, she published Kyi Daw Zet magazine in Mandalay. She founded Dagaon magazine and started writing under the penname "Dagon Khin Khin Lay". She also wrote horror novels as "Ko Ko Lay" and the political literature as "Yuwati Lay Ni". She was also a founder of Burma Women Writers Association.

Khin Khin Lay was married to a fellow journalist and publisher of Bama-Khit newspaper, Ohn Khin. She died on 23 June 1981 in Yangon. She was 77.

Works

Novels
 Nwe Nwe (1917)
 Chit Min Nyo
 Ye Lyin Min Phyit
 Gon Myint Thu
 Chit Annawa
 Shwe Son Nyo
 Nge Kyun Khin
 Sarsodaw (1935)
 Sixty Years: Autobiography(1961)
 Kyun Oo Te Than Lat Khon (1972)
 Kabarhlat Saung Ba (1973)
 Wetmasut Biography (1975)
 Yadanarbon Hteit-Tin Hlaing (1979)

Cinematography
 Sein Yaung Soe
 Chit Sa-No
 Mhya Nat Maung (Cupid)

Publishing
 Kyi Daw Zet
 Bama Khit Newspaper
 Yuwati Journal
 Yuwati Newspaper

Burmese writers
1904 births
1981 deaths
Burmese screenwriters
Burmese cinematographers
People from Mandalay
Burmese women cinematographers
20th-century Burmese women writers
20th-century Burmese writers
20th-century screenwriters